Mike Dempsey is a British practising graphic designer. He has been trained in calligraphy and typography since 1964.

Career 
From the late 1960s Dempsey worked as an art director for two leading British publishing houses, William Heinemann and William Collins & Sons. In 1979 he founded the London-based design consultancy Carroll & Dempsey which later became CDT Design Limited. He created stamps for the Royal Mail, feature film title sequences for Ridley Scott, Louis Malle, Dennis Potter, David Hare and Bruce Beresford, the brand identity for English National Opera, and South Bank Centre to the resigning of the Royal National Theatre and the Royal Opera House.

His personal work has earned him many awards including 10 silver and the coveted gold award from British Design & Art Direction (D&AD). He has acted as Design Advisor to the Department for Digital, Culture, Media and Sport, and he is a prolific stamp designer and was appointed consultant art director by Royal Mail to create the two year Millennium stamp programme during 1999 to 2001 and was the Art Director of the Royal Society of Arts Journal from 1997 to 2002 and is a past President of Design & Art Direction (D&AD). 

He is a regular feature writer for Design Week and has written for Creative Review, Blueprint, The Times, Grafik, V&A magazine and many other publications on design and related issues. RDIinsights is a monthly recorded series, devised and presented by Dempsey, featuring interviews with world class designers, across all disciplines. He was made a Royal Designer for Industry (RDI) in 1994 and was elected a member of Alliance Graphic International in 1998. He was Master of the Faculty of Royal Designers for Industry from 2005 to 2007 and is currently the external design advisor to the Design Council. In 2007 he left CDT Design and founded Studio Dempsey.

References

External links 
 Fontana Modern Masters Dempsey's time as Art Director of Fontana Books in 1974-79.

British graphic designers
Living people
Place of birth missing (living people)
Year of birth missing (living people)